Sattelköpfle is a mountain in on the border of Liechtenstein and Austria in the Rätikon range of the Eastern Alps to the east of the village of Planken, with a height of .

References
 

Mountains of the Alps
Mountains of Liechtenstein
Mountains of Vorarlberg
Austria–Liechtenstein border
International mountains of Europe